Qarabağlı is a former village in the Şabran Rayon of Azerbaijan.

References 

Populated places in Shabran District